The 2016–17 season is the 129th competitive association football season in India.

Promotion and relegation

Indian Super League
Atlético de Kolkata won the title second time after defeating the Kerala Blasters in a penalty shootout, 4–3, during the final. The match had ended 1–1 after ninety minutes and extra time.

Finals

I-League

Head coaching changes

References

 
2016 in Indian sport
2017 in Indian sport
2016 in association football
2017 in association football
Seasons in Indian football